Ivan Brkić (born 29 June 1995) is a Croatian professional footballer who plays as a goalkeeper for Azerbaijan Premier League club Neftçi.

Career statistics

Club

1 One appearance in 2015–16 relegation play-offs.

References

External links
Ivan Brkić at Sofascore

1995 births
Living people
Sportspeople from Koprivnica
Association football goalkeepers
Croatian footballers
Croatia under-21 international footballers
NK Istra 1961 players
NK Lokomotiva Zagreb players 
NK Imotski players
HNK Cibalia players
HŠK Zrinjski Mostar players 
Riga FC players
Neftçi PFK players
Croatian Football League players
First Football League (Croatia) players
Premier League of Bosnia and Herzegovina players
Latvian Higher League players
Azerbaijan Premier League players
Croatian expatriate footballers
Expatriate footballers in Bosnia and Herzegovina
Croatian expatriate sportspeople in Bosnia and Herzegovina
Expatriate footballers in Latvia
Croatian expatriate sportspeople in Latvia
Expatriate footballers in Azerbaijan
Croatian expatriate sportspeople in Azerbaijan